The Louth derby is the name of the association football match played between Drogheda United and Dundalk FC. Outside of Cork and Dublin, Louth is the only county in Ireland that boasts two elite football teams in the League of Ireland. Despite both clubs being formed in 1903 and 1919 respectively, the derby only commenced in 1963, when Drogheda entered the league, and has been contested over 198 times in all competitions. Drogheda have won 59 matches, Dundalk have won 102, and the remaining 38 have been draws.

History

Origins 
The derby has existed since the 1960s, when Drogheda United were inducted into the League of Ireland for the first time. A rivalry was born through several factors, including the close proximity of the clubs; Dundalk's Oriel Park lies just 35 km from Drogheda's Head In The Game Park.

Outside of football, the towns have had a sibling rivalry over the years. As of the 2016 census, Drogheda is the most populated town in the Ireland, with 40,956, and Dundalk sit at 3rd on that list with 39,004. They are also the 2 largest towns in the country by land mass. The emergence of the two football teams only adds to an already existing divide between the settlements.

Despite the intense rivalry, there is also a healthy respect between the two clubs. Many players have played for both teams over the years, and there is a recognition that the rivalry between Drogheda and Dundalk is an important part of Irish football history. Overall, the Louth Derby is considered to be one of the most iconic and longstanding rivalries in Irish football, along with that of Bohemians and Shamrock Rovers, and is always eagerly anticipated by fans of both clubs.

Derby history
The first ever Louth Derby was played when Drogheda United were known as “Drogheda FC” back in 1963, in the first round of the now defunct Dublin City Cup, at Oriel Park on 16 August 1963. The game finished 4-3 to the home team, although Drogheda looked the more likely to pull off a shock result in their maiden outing before a goal from Dermot Cross in the 87th minute saw Dundalk through to the next round. 3 months later, Dundalk hammered Drogheda 6-1 at Lourdes Stadium in the first league meeting between the neighbouring clubs, but around a year onwards, on 22 November 1964, Drogheda sought revenge and recorded their first ever win against Dundalk with a 3-1 victory at Oriel Park.

In 1966, Drogheda United and Dundalk organised the first of a series of annual friendly matches, known as the Donegan Cup. The first of these was a two legged encounter which Dundalk won 5-2 on aggregate. The fixture became an on and off event until 1984, when the teams began struggling to choose a date due to hectic fixture lists.

During the 1971/72 season, Drogheda United made it to the final of the League of Ireland Shield, where they faced their county rivals but lost 5-0. To date, this remains the only time that Dundalk and Drogheda have competed in the final of a major competition.

Dundalk enjoyed periods of success in the mid to late 70s, winning the league in both 1975/76 and 1978/79, but Drogheda adjusted well to life in the League of Ireland, recording a number of wins against them, including a 1-0 away win against the reigning champions in 1977. In fact, the Drogs went unbeaten in Louth Derbies in the league for 3 years, and on 4 February 1979, Drogheda won the last Louth derby at Lourdes Stadium 1-0, before moving to United Park later that year. Dundalk ended this run by winning 2-0 in the first derby held at United Park.

The longest unbeaten period in the fixture was enjoyed by Dundalk, when they failed to lose in 23 in all competitions for over 9 years between 4 December 1983 and 5 August 1993, a period in which they won 5 major trophies, including 2 league titles and an FAI Cup. The streak was ended by Drogheda who won 1-0 at Oriel Park on 26 August 1993.

At the end of the 1993/94 season, Drogheda were relegated to the First Division, meaning the derby was put on hold until 1995/96, when they came back up again as runners up and beat reigning champions Dundalk twice; a 3-2 on 20 October 1995, and a 2-1 on 14 April 1996, as well as drawing 2-2 at Oriel Park on 21 January 1996. Despite this, they were relegated again, but were promoted straight after the 1996/97 season to beat Dundalk home and away on 23 January and 16 April 1998. Drogheda finished last and went down for a third time, but won the 1998/99 First Division. This time, Dundalk had been relegated, and the derby wasn’t played again until 2000/01, when Drogheda found themselves back in the First Division, this time accompanied by their Louth rivals, who beat them 4 times and were promoted as champions. The Drogs were back in the Premier Division a year later, and that is where they stayed for the next 14 years, but Dundalk slumped back down, meaning the Louth Derby was not played as a league fixture until Dundalk were promoted at the end of 2008.

In 1997, the annual pre season friendly between the clubs was revived in honour of Dundalk stalwart Jim Malone, who passed away in 1996. On 5 October that year, Drogheda won the inaugural match, beating Dundalk 4-2 on penalties after a 2-2 draw at Oriel Park. Dundalk got their first Malone Cup victory 3 years later, on 5 July 2000, with a 3-0 away win.

Drogheda stumbled upon Dundalk a number of times throughout the 2000s in domestic cups. On 30 July 2004, they defeated them 3-2 in an FAI Cup round 2 replay, when a late Dundalk flurry of goals from Simon Kelly and Steven Napier wasn’t enough to cancel out a brace from John Lester and a goal from Declan “Fabio” O’Brien. A year later, they won 2-0 in round 3 at Oriel Park, Mark Leech and Damian Lynch scoring for the Drogs, who went on to beat Cork City 2-0 in the final and lift the FAI Cup for the first time, the first of 4 trophies during Drogheda’s “golden era”.

In pre season of 2009, Declan “Fabio” O’Brien, Drogheda legend, moved from the Boynesiders to the Lilywhites on a free transfer, and was met with a hostile reception by the home supporters at United Park when he lined out for Dundalk in the Jim Malone Cup match on 24 February. He was branded a traitor, subjected to banners reading “Judas”, and a pigs head was thrown onto the pitch, inspired by the infamous incident involving Luís Figo at the Camp Nou in 2002. Drogheda went on to win the game 4-3 on penalties after a scoreless draw, with O'Brien missing his spot kick, but he retained his legendary status at the club when he rejoined them ahead of the 2012 season and helped them win the League Cup.

The first league meeting for almost 8 years was on 20 March 2009, when Dundalk won 3-0 at Oriel Park courtesy of a brace of penalties from Chris Turner and a goal from Darren Mansaram. Drogheda, who were suffering from financial difficulties, fell to a 4-2 defeat later that year when Alex Williams scored twice in between goals from Ger Rowe and Chris Turner. Drogheda failed to win another league derby until 10 June 2011 when Dinny Corcoran and Philip Hand helped them to a 2-1 win despite Daniel Kearns striking back in the 86th minute. That same year, Dundalk found their first cup win against the Drogs since 2003, a terrific goal from Keith Ward and another from Mark Quigley 5 minutes later securing their place in round 5 of the FAI Cup.

In 2012, Drogheda produced a fantastic comeback at United Park on 31 August. Dundalk looked on course for a surprise victory, going 2-0 up inside 31 minutes thanks to Mark Griffin, but their lead slipped away when Peter Hynes scored after half an hour, and grabbed the equaliser in the 87th minute. Drogheda would have been forgiven for holding on for a draw, but miraculously grabbed all three points in injury time when John Sullivan scored the winner. On 6 October 2013 they made it to the FAI Cup final once again when they controversially beat Dundalk 1-0 in front of 2,000 people at United Park, a game dubbed "The biggest Louth Derby in history" by the Dundalk Democrat. Their biggest ever derby victory came on opening day of the 2014 campaign, Declan O’Brien netting a brace after goals from Eric Foley and Gavin Brennan proved enough to stifle Dundalk, who struck through Patrick Hoban, and win 4-1 on 7 March. The game also saw 3 red cards, for Philip Hughes, Gavin Brennan, and Simon Kelly. Despite opening day defeat, Dundalk went on to beat the Drogs 7-0 at Oriel on 20 May, their largest victory over them, and win the league title for the first time in 19 years, the start of a period of complete dominance by the Lilywhites.

Dundalk saw their most successful period under Stephen Kenny between 2013 and 2018, and didn’t taste derby defeat at all between 2014 and 2021, a period in which they won a remarkable 11 major trophies. On 18 September 2015, they embarrassed Drogheda 6-0 at Oriel Park, 4 goals from Richie Towell and strikes from Daryl Horgan and David McMillan pretty much condemning them to relegation whilst Dundalk retained the title. They repeated the feat 2 years later, on 16 June 2017, after Drogheda had been promoted through the playoffs in 2016. Braces from David McMillan and Ciarán Kilduff, alongside goals from Patrick McEleney and Michael Duffy, were met with no response from the home team who saw Thomas Byrne sent off during the game. Drogheda United were relegated at the end of the 2017 season, and remained in the First Division until they won it in 2020. In this time, Dundalk had won 2 league titles, 2 FAI Cups, 1 League Cup and played in the Europa League group stages.

In 2021, the first competitive Louth Derby for 4 years, and due to the COVID 19 pandemic, the first ever behind closed doors, was played at Oriel Park on 24 April, a 2-1 victory for the hosts. On 20 August, Drogheda recorded a historic win at Oriel Park when a brace from Mark Doyle helped them to a 2-1 victory, their first away win over Dundalk for just under a decade. The result was a blow to Dundalk, who were already suffering their worst season for 8 years, and it looked possible that newly promoted Drogheda would finish above them in the league. With Dundalk in 7th place, and Drogheda in 6th, the sides faced off on 4 November at United Park. The game looked headed towards a 0-0 draw, until Daniel Cleary bundled the ball over the line to win the game in the 86th minute and secure Dundalk’s safety.
On 11 February 2022, goals from James Clarke and Chris Lyons saw Drogheda win the Jim Malone Cup with a 2-1 victory at Oriel Park, ending a 7 year streak of Dundalk dominance. On 18 March, they repeated the feat, when a Dean Williams penalty led them to a 1-0 home victory, their first for 8 years. Despite suffering a 4-1 humbling at Oriel Park on 29 April courtesy of goals from Darragh Leahy, Patrick Hoban and John Martin, Drogheda recorded another home win against high flying Dundalk on 8 July when Dean Williams scored the winner again, this time inside 1 minute.

Successes 
Dundalk are one of the most historically successful teams in Irish football history. They were the first team from Ireland to win an away game in Europe, and to date have won 49 major trophies, including 14 league titles and 12 FAI Cups. Their most successful period came in the mid-2010s, under manager Stephen Kenny, when they won 5 league titles in 6 years, and made it to the FAI Cup final 6 years in a row. Dundalk made history in 2016 and 2020 when they qualified for the group stages of the UEFA Europa League, becoming the first Irish team to compete in the competition on two occasions. Dundalk's successful period came whilst Drogheda were competing in the First Division, or struggling at the bottom of the Premier Division.

In comparison, Drogheda United's most successful period came in the mid-2000s, when Dundalk were in the First Division. They won the FAI Cup in 2005, two Setanta Sports Cups in 2006 and 2007, and their first League of Ireland title in 2007. They came close to European qualification 4 times; the UEFA Cup in 2006 and 2007, and the UEFA Champions League in 2008 and 2013. The gulf in success between the two teams fuels the rivalry between the two teams. The Drogs only returned to the top flight ahead of the 2021 season, after a 4-year stint in the First Division.

Club structures 
Both teams have recovered from significant financial difficulties in the wake of the Celtic Tiger. Dundalk were close to extinction in 2012, but were saved when a local consortium stabilised and took over the club. Drogheda survived examinership after a court ruling in 2008, on the basis that they remain a semi-professional outfit until in a financially comfortable position to switch to a full time set up. This has contributed to the gap between the teams, as Dundalk became a fully professional team in 2017.

Dundalk's ownership also contributes to the difference between the sides. They receive financial support from their owners, whereas Drogheda United are supporter-owned, and funded on a much smaller scale by their fans.

Supporters 
The matches between Drogheda and Dundalk are known for their intense atmosphere and passionate support from both sets of fans. The fanbases of both clubs are somewhat evenly spread across County Louth. Dundalk gain most of their following from the north of the county, across regions such as Blackrock, Carlingford, Lordship, Omeath, Ravensdale, Castlebellingham, Knockbridge, Dromiskin, and Louth Village, as well as Counties Down and Armagh. Drogheda's support spreads across the south of the region and stretches into County Meath, across Ardee, Termonfeckin, Dunleer, Collon, Slane, Togher, Baltray, Clogherhead, Laytown, Bettystown, Duleek and even as far as Navan and Balbriggan

The fixture itself regularly provides a fiery atmosphere. The home sections usually sell out, and away fans travel in large numbers to witness the encounter. It has seen many red cards over the years, and once or twice has seen conflict between sets of so-called "supporters". Both teams have singing sections; Dundalk's "Shedside Army" and Drogheda's "Famous 45 Ultras". They direct derogatory chants at each other, poking fun at the other for living in an inferior town or having a bad fanbase.

Notable games

The first ever Louth Derby came in the now defunct Dublin City Cup in the same year that Drogheda first entered the League of Ireland, and produced an exciting spectacle. Dundalk were the victors in a 4-3 thriller, scoring the winning goal in the 87th minute. 4,000 people were estimated to have filled Oriel Park that night.

The largest Louth Derby crowd in history bore witness to an eventful encounter in the round 1 replay of the FAI Cup at O2 Park. After a 1-1 draw at Oriel the week before, it was Drogheda who emerged victorious. Despite Mick Byrne taking the lead for the visitors just after half time, former Dundalk player Tom Sullivan came back to haunt them with the equaliser, and Trevor Croly was the match winner in extra time.

A grand stand finish at Oriel Park in October 1997 set the tone for many future Louth Derbies to come. Honours were even in a scrappy contest, with Drogheda having the better share of chances, and the sending off of Dundalk's Peter Whitnell in the 75th minute made a win look likely. However, David Crawley's late attempted cross snuck inside the near post after goalkeeper Eddie van Boxtel fluffed his lines, and it looked as if the Lilywhites had snatched it. Incredibly, inside injury time, substitute Brian Irwin found himself in an abundance of space and impressively volleyed into the net to rescue a well earned point for the Drogs.

Drogheda took on their county rivals in the FAI Cup for the second year running, this time on the new artificial surface of Oriel Park, and walked away with a comfortable 2-0 victory. An late first half rally saw Mark Leech dispatch his header, followed up by a penalty minutes later by Damian Lynch that saw them advanced to the quarter finals. A significant result as the Drogs went on to win the competition that year, beating Cork City 2-0 in the final at Lansdowne Road.

Dundalk came into the game in search of their first away points of the season, with Drogheda also in a poor run of form. Dinny Corcoran scored for the hosts completely against the run of play, but Dundalk managed to keep the game alive by clawing one back in the 56th minute through Colin Hawkins. The comeback was complete when Daniel Kearns' header in the 84th minute secured the win.

The second of a whopping 6 Louth Derbies in 2011 saw Drogheda take the bragging rights from Oriel Park in June. Dinny Corcoran took the lead before a stunning free kick from Philip Hand found the top corner. Daniel Kearns repeated his feat of scoring a late derby goal, but it wasn't enough to keep Dundalk's 8 month unbeaten run to an end, and Drogheda recorded their first league win over Dundalk for over 13 years, spanning back to 1998.

An FAI Cup 4th round replay was on the cards just 4 days after the sides played out a 1-1 draw in Drogheda. Keith Ward scored a stunning finesse shot which looped over the keeper from outside the box, before Mark Quigley doubled the lead. A late goal from Jordan White proved only a consolation, and Dundalk commenced into the next round of the cup.

 

A mouth watering League Cup quarter final was evenly contested at Hunky Dorys Park between the sides, with Eric Foley taking the lead for the hosts before Mark Griffin levelled affairs after half time. After 120 minutes of football, the teams could not be separated, and local boy Gavin Brennan was the hero as his winning penalty in the shootout sent Drogheda United to the semi finals. They would go on to win the competition, beating Shamrock Rovers in the final.

Drogheda United's first home league win over Dundalk since 1998 came in very dramatic fashion. The visitors looked good value for a win to end their bad run of form, with Mark Griffin netting two wonderful goals within the first half hour, but the Drogs kept pushing and got their rewards. A brace from Peter Hynes and a last minute winner from John Sullivan saw them snatch the three points in an unbelievable turn of events.

Dundalk's shock title race in 2013 was interesting viewing for neutrals, but Drogheda visited Oriel Park in September with the aim of extinguishing it. After an abundance of chances for both teams, it looked like it was going to end all square, but a defensive mistake from Alan McNally was pounced on by Dundalk captain Stephen O'Donnell, who slotted home to win the tie in dramatic fashion with just seconds remaining.

An fiery classic between Drogheda and Dundalk, dubbed "the biggest Louth Derby in history" by the Dundalk Democrat, as they battled for a place in the FAI Cup final in a hostile encounter. Tensions boiled over when Darren Meehan was dismissed for a dangerous tackle just 26 minutes in, and Dundalk were astonishingly reduced to 9 men just 5 minutes later when Chris Shields saw red for his challenge on Declan O'Brien inside the box. Gavin Brennan dispatched the resulting penalty kick, and inspired the Drogs to their first FAI Cup final in 8 years.

 

To date, this match on the opening night of the 2014 season remains Drogheda United's largest ever victory over their county rivals. The hosts were impressive either side of the half time interval, with goals from Eric Foley, Gavin Brennan, and a brace from all time top goalscorer Declan O'Brien saw them smother Dundalk. Patrick Hoban netted a consolation just past the hour mark, and Brennan received a red card in the 86th minute for a late tackle on Stephen O'Donnell.

A game where Dundalk showed the peak of their powers, with a remarkable 5 different players on the scoresheet. Drogheda United were humbled on a historic night for the hosts at Oriel Park. The Lilywhites went on to win the league title that year, the first of many to come under Stephen Kenny.

 

Another difficult evening for Drogheda as their defence fell to a whopping 4 goals from Richie Towell, and Dundalk flexed their muscles yet again on a memorable night for their supporters. The gulf of class between the teams had really begun to become evident, and Dundalk retained the league title that season as Drogheda slumped back down to the First Division.

Dundalk's largest victory recorded at United Park, as Drogheda fell to a side widely regarded as the best in Irish football history. Braces from David McMillan and Ciaran Kilduff, either side of a goal of the season contender from Patrick McEleney gave Dundalk supporters a day out to remember, and put a stamp on things for the Drogs who were relegated again by the end of the campaign.

Newly promoted Drogheda recording their first win over Dundalk since 2014, and their first win at Oriel Park since 2012, was a sign that the days of derby demolitions were over. Mark Doyle's brace came at a time when Dundalk were placed 8th in the table during their worst season since 2011. The win was a massive statement from Drogheda United and their supporters, who lost academy coach David Conroy just days before the fixture took place in front of a limited 600 home supporters and 0 of their away supporters due to the COVID-19 pandemic.

The stakes were higher than ever on a cold November night in Drogheda, and this game could be considered one of the most closely contested Louth Derbies of recent history. With Dundalk still suffering from a horrendous campaign, Drogheda came into the game 2 points ahead their rivals with the chance to finish above them for the first time since 2012 by opening up a 5 point gap ahead of the last 2 games of the season. 0-0 for the majority of the game, up stepped centre back Daniel Cleary who managed to bundle the ball over the line and save Dundalk from shock relegation in the 86th minute. Dundalk went on to finish in 6th, above the Drogs by 4 points.

 

Despite a level of confidence ahead of the game, Dundalk's bad record at United Park continued as Drogheda inflicted them with their first defeat of the season. It was the first time the hosts had won a derby at home for 8 years, and was definitely one worth celebrating. Youngster Dean Williams became a cult hero when he converted a penalty kick just after half time.

All–time results

League results

Cup results

Friendly results

Statistics

Records

Top scorers

Most appearances

Other records

See also
 Local derby
 Derbies in the League of Ireland

References

Derbies in the League of Ireland